Benedikt Sigurðsson Gröndal (7 July 1924 – 20 July 2010) was prime minister of Iceland for the Social Democratic Party (Alþýðuflokkurinn) from 15 October 1979 to 8 February 1980. Prior to that he was Minister of Foreign Affairs 1978–1980. He was minister of foreign affairs during his tenure as PM, therefore the only politician from the independence 1944 to serve in both cabinet positions at the same time. His government was the second Social Democrat minority government of Iceland. He was member of Althingi from 1956 to 1982 and led his party from 1974 to 1980. He attended the General Assembly of the United Nations in 1966. 
After leaving the political scene in 1982 Benedikt Sigurðsson Gröndal was appointed ambassador of Iceland to Sweden and Finland. After residing for some years in Stockholm he served as roving ambassador to the Far East, including Australia, China, South Korea and Japan. After serving two years as representative to the United Nations Benedikt Gröndal retired to his native home in 1991. He died on 20 July 2010 at the age of 86.

References

Grondal, Benedikt Sigurdsson
Grondal, Benedikt Sigurdsson
Ambassadors of Iceland to Australia
Ambassadors of Iceland to China
Ambassadors of Iceland to Finland
Ambassadors of Iceland to Japan
Ambassadors of Iceland to South Korea
Ambassadors of Iceland to Sweden
Members of the Althing
Permanent Representatives of Iceland to the United Nations
Prime Ministers of Iceland
Social Democratic Party (Iceland) politicians
Grondal, Benedikt Sigurdsson
Grondal, Benedikt Sigurdsson